This is a list of people who served as Chief Whip of the Ulster Unionist Party in the Parliament of the United Kingdom, the Parliament of Northern Ireland and the Northern Ireland Assembly.

Parliament of the United Kingdom
1886: William Ellison-Macartney and Robert Uniacke-Penrose-Fitzgerald
James Kilfedder
1974: Robert Bradford
1975: Harold McCusker
1978: William Ross
1997: Martin Smyth
2001: Roy Beggs
2005: Post vacant
2015: None appointed

Parliament of Northern Ireland
Until 1969, Chief Whips were given the title "Parliamentary Secretary to the Ministry of Finance".

1921: Herbert Dixon, 1st Baron Glentoran
1942: Sir Norman Stronge
1944: Sir Wilson Hungerford
1945: Lancelot Curran
1947: Walter Topping
1956: Brian Faulkner
1959: Isaac George Hawthorne
1963: William Craig
1963: James Chichester-Clark
1966: Post vacant
1968: Roy Bradford
1969: John Dobson
1971: John Brooke

Assistant Whips
Until 1969, Assistant Whips were given the title "Assistant Parliamentary Secretary to the Ministry of Finance".
1921: Thomas Henry Burn
1925: Henry Mulholland
1929: Sir Basil Brooke
1933: Sir Wilson Hungerford
1941: Sir Norman Stronge
1942: Robert Corkey
1943: vacant
1945: John Edgar Bailey
1958: Harry West
1958: William James Morgan
1961: William Fitzsimmons
1963: James Chichester-Clark
1963: vacant
1965: Isaac George Hawthorne
1966: Roy Bradford and Samuel Magowan
1967: Samuel Magowan and vacancy
1968: Samuel Magowan and Joseph Burns
1969: Samuel Magowan and John William Kennedy

Northern Ireland Assembly
1973: Lloyd Hall-Thompson
1975: Austin Ardill
1982: William Douglas
1996: Robert Coulter
1998: Jim Wilson
2001: Ivan Davis 
2004: David McClarty
2007: David McNarry
2008: Fred Cobain
2011: John McCallister
2012: Robin Swann
2017: Steve Aiken
2019: Robbie Butler

See also

Ulster Unionist Party
Political whips